Nose, Iranian Style is a 2005 Iranian documentary film directed by Mehrdad Oskouei. It is about nose jobs (rhinoplasty) in Iran, which statistically has the most of any country. The documentary employs a semi-comedic tone, with the title referencing the earlier film Divorce, Iranian Style. Nose, Iranian Style relates the trend to politics, with it and the 2007 documentary Tehran: 11 pm connecting it to the importance of appearance, given the taboo of men and women directly and socially interacting. However, Oskouei said the film was truly a critique of excessive consumerism.

Variety critic Deborah Young positively reviewed Nose, Iranian Style as "A surprising, compulsively watchable documentary." It became Oskouei's most famous film internationally.

Festivals 
 18th Int'l Documentary Film Festival Amsterdam (IDFA)(2005/Netherlands) 
Nomination Golden MovieSquad DOC U! Award 
 Salaam DK – Multi cultural Film Festival (2006/Denmark) 
 2nd Ukrainian Int’l Documentary Film Festival "Contact" (2006/Ukraine) 
 3rd EBS Int’l Documentary Film Festival (2006/Seoul, Korea)
 Oslo Documentary Film Festival (5 – 15 Oct 2006/Norway) 
 5th Tek Film Festival (2006/Italy) 
 Sixth Biennial of Iranian Studies in Iran Heritage (2006/London, UK) 
 5th Int’l Documentary & Short Films Festival (2006/Prizren, Kozova)
 1st Irans Film Festival (2006/Utrecht, Netherland)
 Rio de Janeiro Int'l Film Festival (2006 /Rio, Brazil) 
 9th Int’l 1001 documentary Film Festival (2006/Istanbul, Turkey)
 Film From the South (2006/Norway) 
 Museum of Fine Arts US (2006/USA) 
 Jakarta Int’l Film Festival (2006/Indonesia) 
 UCLA Film & Television Archive (2007/Los Angeles, USA) 
 Aljazeera Int'l Film Festival (2007/Aljazzera, Qatar) 
 Syracuse Int'l Film Festival (2007/USA) 
 Visual Representations of Iran (2008/St.Andrews, Scotland)
 Berlins Cinema Babylon (2008/Germany) 
 Faito Documentary Film Festival (2008/Italy) 
 Belmont World Film (2009/USA) 
 6th Planet Documentary Review Film Festival (2009/Poland)
 "Retrospective of Mehrdad Oskouei",s films, Images Cinema (2011/Williamstown, USA)
 "Retrospective of Mehrdad Oskouei", Das Iranische Wien, Filmarchiv Austria (2012/Vienna. Austria)

References

External links
 

2005 documentary films
2005 films
Documentary films about health care
Iranian documentary films
2000s Persian-language films
Plastic surgery